KL 10 Patthu is a 2015 Malayalam romantic comedy film written and directed by debutant Muhsin Parari. Unni Mukundan and Chandini Sreedharan portrays the lead characters in the film, along with Saiju Kurup, Aju Varghese, Neeraj Madhav, Mamukkoya and Sreenath Bhasi in supporting roles.

Plot

Film begins when Jinn narrates about a village and few of the village guys such as  Ahmed, a web journalist and passionate football player - who accidentally saw a girl  in a film festival held at Kozhikode and become lonely thinking about her. Things change when Shadiya joins his college for a project and Teacher Ali wants Ahmed to guide Shadiya about the lectures and college campus. Two of them fall in love and later decides to marry secretly. Being his best friend Ahmed tells Faizal about his affair and their marriage. Faizal tells this matter to Ajmal, Ahmed's brother on the day where Shadiya and Ahmed left the town for marriage. Ajmal along with Faizal and few of their friends went in search for Ahmed and Shadiya. Film portrays the remaining incidents on this day.

The music label for the movie is Muzik247

Cast 
 Unni Mukundan as Ahmed
 Chandini Sreedharan as Shadiya/Hadiya
 Saiju Kurup as Ajmal
 Sreenath Bhasi as Djinn
 Mamukoya as Hamsakutty
 Aju Varghese as Faizal
 Neeraj Madhav as Afthab
 Aneesh Menon as Yousef
 Shivaji Guruvayoor as Beeran
 Anil Murali as Bavakka
 Rajesh Hebbar as Kunju
 Ahmed Sidhique  as Rosshan
 Neena Kurup as Raseena
 Thomas Kuriakose
 Santhosh Keezhattoor as Ali Sir
 Sudhi Koppa as Nizam
 Pradeep Kottayam as Registrar

Music

References

External links
 Official Facebook Page
 Official Trailer

2015 films
2010s Malayalam-language films